Álvaro López San Martín (born 2 June 1997 in Barcelona) is a Spanish tennis player.

López San Martín won the 2015 French Open boys' doubles championship, partnering Jaume Munar.

López San Martín has a career high ATP singles ranking of 349 achieved on 30 January 2017.

Doubles: 1 (1 title)

ATP Challenger and ITF Futures finals

Singles: 26 (14–12)

Doubles: 10 (7–3)

External links
 
 

1997 births
Living people
Spanish male tennis players
Tennis players from Barcelona
French Open junior champions
Grand Slam (tennis) champions in boys' doubles
Competitors at the 2022 Mediterranean Games
Mediterranean Games silver medalists for Spain
Mediterranean Games medalists in tennis
20th-century Spanish people
21st-century Spanish people